Dangjeong Station is an infill station on the Seoul Metropolitan Subway Line 1.  It serves the city of Gunpo in Gyeonggi-do, South Korea and is the subway station closest to Hansei University.

References

Railway stations opened in 2010
Seoul Metropolitan Subway stations
Metro stations in Gunpo